= North American Journal of Psychology =

- Discipline: Psychology
- Language: English
- Edited by: Lynn E. McCutcheon

Publication details
- History: 1999–present
- Frequency: Triannual

Standard abbreviations
- ISO 4: N. Am. J. Psychol.

Indexing
- ISSN: 1527-7143
- OCLC no.: 60624866

Links
- Journal homepage

The North American Journal of Psychology is a triannual peer-reviewed academic journal that was established in 1999 by Lynn E. McCutcheon, who is currently the editor-in-chief. It covers all areas of psychology, especially personality, social, and developmental psychology. The journal publishes original research articles, literature reviews, qualitative studies, and interviews with notable psychologists. It is abstracted and indexed in PsycINFO and ProQuest.
